Ambroli Church is a Church of North India church in Girgaum, Mumbai that was established in 1831 by the Scottish missionary John Wilson. The unusual name derives from Ambroli House, the name of Wilson's home where the church first gathered. It is believed Ambroli refers to the  Gujarati hometown of the migrants who settled in Mumbai, but it is not clear if that place is Amroli. Wilson's educational mission was planned at this site, which led to the founding of Wilson College and Wilson High School. The church covenant was made on the 4th of February 1831, and the first service was  held in Wilson's home on the 6th. Services were conducted in three languages: Hindustani, Marathi and English.
The first members of the church included the Scottish missionary couple John and Margaret Wilson, three Brahman men from the Konkan, one Wani merchant, one Vaishya journalist, one Maratha woman from Bombay, one African sailor, and one "Indo-Portuguese" man from the Konkan who was a former Roman Catholic priest.

References

Churches in Mumbai
Church of North India church buildings
1831 establishments in India
Religious buildings and structures completed in 1831
Gothic Revival church buildings in India